Tigirmenevo (Tigermän) is a rural locality (a village) in Baymurzinsky Selsoviet, Mishkinsky District, Bashkortostan, Russia. The population was 241 as of 2010. There are 4 streets.

Geography 
Tigirmenevo is located 50 km northwest of Mishkino (the district's administrative centre) by road. Kyzyl-Yul is the nearest rural locality.

References 

Rural localities in Mishkinsky District